Tasos Kyriakos (born 14 August 1978) is a Greek  footballer who plays as a defender or midfielder.

Career
Born in Giannouli, Larissa, Kyriakos started his career at his hometown with Apollon Larissa and he later moved to the local giants AEL, then playing in Beta Ethniki.

Since 2002 he has been playing in the Greek First Division, as a member of Kallithea, Olympiacos, Aris, Asteras Tripolis and again AEL, where he returned on 25 August 2008 and played for one season. On 15 July 2013 he signed an annual contract with Iraklis. In January 2014, Kyriakos signed a contract with Greek Football League club Paniliakos F.C.

The transfer from Kallithea F.C. to Olympiacos F.C. was by some seen as a surprise move despite the fact that Olympiacos F.C. had competition for the signature of the player. Rumors in the Greek media, Ethnospor among others, claimed that Brøndby IF and their head coach Michael Laudrup expressed their interest in Kyriakos just before Olympiacos F.C. signed him.

Honours
Omonia
Cypriot Championship: 2009–10

References

External links
 
Profile at Onsports.gr
Myplayer.gr Profile

1978 births
Living people
People from Larissa (regional unit)
Greek footballers
Athlitiki Enosi Larissa F.C. players
Kallithea F.C. players
Olympiacos F.C. players
Aris Thessaloniki F.C. players
Asteras Tripolis F.C. players
AC Omonia players
PAS Giannina F.C. players
Niki Volos F.C. players
Iraklis Thessaloniki F.C. players
Paniliakos F.C. players
Apollon Smyrnis F.C. players
Expatriate footballers in Cyprus
Super League Greece players
Cypriot First Division players
Association football defenders
Association football midfielders
Footballers from Thessaly